Phyllonorycter cretaceella is a moth of the family Gracillariidae. It is known from Arizona, United States.

The larvae feed on Quercus hypoleuca and Quercus hypoleucoides. They mine the leaves of their host plant. The mine has the form of a yellowish and brownish blotch mine on the upperside of the leaf. There is a single wrinkle in the epidermis.

References

cretaceella
Moths of North America

Lepidoptera of the United States
Moths described in 1925
Taxa named by Annette Frances Braun
Leaf miners